Micheler is a surname. Notable people with the surname include:

Joseph Alfred Micheler (1861–1931), French general
Peter Micheler, West German-Luxembourgish slalom canoeist

See also
Elisabeth Micheler-Jones (born 1966), West German slalom canoeist
Michler